Félix Reynier Guerra Rondón (born 14 January 1989), is a Cuban international footballer that plays for the Cuba national football team.

Club career
Guerra played for his local provincial outfit Granma, but joined Camagüey for the 2014 season.

International career
He made his international debut for Cuba in a February 2012 friendly match against Jamaica and has, as of January 2018, earned a total of 11 caps, scoring no goals. He represented his country in 1 FIFA World Cup qualification match and was called up to the Cuba team for the 2015 CONCACAF Gold Cup. He played in Cuba's opening game against Mexico, a 6–0 loss.

References

External links
 
 

1989 births
Living people
Cuban footballers
Cuba international footballers
Association football midfielders
CF Granma players
FC Camagüey players
2015 CONCACAF Gold Cup players
People from Granma Province
21st-century Cuban people